The name Sukkot (Succoth) appears in a number of places in the Hebrew Bible as a location:

Egypt
An Egyptian Sukkot is the second of the stations of the Exodus.  According to the Hebrew bible, God had sent Moses to rescue the Israelites from captivity by an unnamed Pharaoh - who later allowed the Israelites to leave Egypt, and they journeyed from their starting point at Pi-Rameses to Succoth (Exodus 12:37). This Sukkot is believed by many scholars to be an adaptation of the Egyptian toponym Tjeku, which is located in the eastern Delta.

Transjordan
Another Sukkot is a city east of the Jordan River, identified as tell Deir Alla,  a high debris mound in the plain north of Jabbok and about one mile from it (Joshua 13:27).  The identification is based on a passage in the Jerusalem Talmud (compiled in the 4th century CE), in which biblical Sukkot was identified with a settlement called Dar'ellah.

This is where Jacob, on returning from Padan-aram after an interview with Esau, built a house for himself and made sukkot (booths) for his cattle, (Genesis 33:17). In the book of Judges, the princes of Sukkot refused to provide help to Gideon and his men when they followed one of the bands of the fugitive Midianites after the great victory at Gilboa. After routing this band, Gideon on his return visited the rulers of the city with severe punishment. "He took the elders of the city, and thorns of the wilderness and briers, and with them he taught the men of Sukkot" (Book of Judges 8:13–16). Sukkot is also mentioned in relation to the battles of Saul and David (1 Samuel 17:1). The foundries for casting the metal-work for the temple were erected here (1 Kings 7:46).

References

Wadi Tumilat
Transjordan (region)